Thalassobacillus is a Gram-positive, oxidase positive, catalase negative, rod shaped and moderately halophilic genus of bacteria from the family of Bacillaceae. Single colonies are small (pin headed) in size.Thalassobacillus bacteria produces Meso-diaminopimelic acid. S.I. Paul et al. (2021) isolated and biochemically characterized Thalassobacillus devorans from marine sponges of the Saint Martin's Island of the Bay of Bengal, Bangladesh.

References

Further reading 
 
 
 
 

Bacillaceae
Bacteria genera